Below are the squads for the 2019 Merlion Cup, which takes place between  7 to 9 June 2019.

Teams

Singapore

Indonesia
Head coach:  Indra Sjafri

Philippines
Head coach:  Anto Gonzales

Thailand
Head coach:  Alexandre Gama

References

Merlion Cup, 2019